Korukonda Mandal is one of the 19 mandals in East Godavari District of Andhra Pradesh. As per census 2011, there are 18 villages. Majority of Korukonda Mandal is under the jurisdiction of Greater Rajamaendravaram Municipal Corporation (GRMC).

Demographics 
Korukonda Mandal has total population of 79,553 as per the Census 2011 out of which 39,620 are males while 39,933 are females and the average Sex Ratio of Korukonda Mandal is 1,008. The total literacy rate of Korukonda Mandal is 62.84%. The male literacy rate is 57.45% and the female literacy rate is 54.37%.

Towns & Villages

Villages 
Bodleddupalem
Burugupudi
Butchempeta
Dosakayalapalle
Gadala
Gadarada
Jambupatnam
Kanupuru
Kapavaram
Korukonda
Koti
Kotikesavaram
Madhurapudi
Munagala
Narasapuram
Nidigatla
Raghavapuram
Srirangapatnam

See also 
List of mandals in Andhra Pradesh

References 

Mandals in East Godavari district